The 1986 Air Force Falcons football team represented the United States Air Force Academy in the 1986 NCAA Division I-A football season. The team was led by third-year head coach Fisher DeBerry and played its home games at Falcon Stadium. They finished the season with a 6–5 record overall and a 5–2 record in Western Athletic Conference games.

Schedule

Personnel

References

Air Force
Air Force Falcons football seasons
Air Force Falcons football